John Russell Pope (April 24, 1874 – August 27, 1937) was an American architect whose firm is widely known for designing major public buildings, including the National Archives and Records Administration building (completed in 1935), the Jefferson Memorial (completed in 1943) and the West Building of the National Gallery of Art (completed in 1941), all in Washington, D.C.

Biography

Early life
Pope was born in New York City in 1874, the son of a successful portrait painter and his wife. He studied architecture at Columbia University and graduated in 1894. He was the first recipient of the Rome Prize to attend the newly founded American Academy in Rome, a training ground for the designers of the "American Renaissance." He would remain involved with the Academy until his death.

Pope traveled for two years through Italy and Greece, where he studied, sketched and made measured drawings of more Romanesque, Gothic, and Renaissance structures than he did of the remains of ancient buildings. Pope was one of the first architectural students to master the use of the large-format camera, with glass negatives.  Pope attended the École des Beaux-Arts in Paris in 1896, honing his Beaux-Arts style. After returning to New York in 1900, he worked for a few years in the office of Bruce Price before opening his own practice.

American architect
Throughout his career, Pope designed private houses such as The Waves, his personal residence at Newport, Rhode Island, and public buildings in addition to the Jefferson Memorial and the National Gallery, such as the massive Masonic House of the Temple (1911–1915), also in Washington, and the triumphal arch Theodore Roosevelt Memorial (1936) at the American Museum of Natural History in New York City.

He designed the extension of the Henry Clay Frick mansion in New York City that created the Garden Court and music room, among other features, as the house was expanded to be operated as a museum.

In 1912 he submitted several proposals for the Lincoln Memorial, but lost out to Henry Bacon.
 
In 1919, he developed a master plan for the future growth of Yale University. Pope's plan for Yale was significantly revised by James Gamble Rogers in 1921, who had more sympathy for the requirements of the city of New Haven, Connecticut. Rogers did keep the Collegiate Gothic unifying theme offered by Pope. Pope's original plan is a prime document in the City Beautiful movement in city planning. Pope won a Silver Medal in the 1932 Summer Olympics for his design of the Payne Whitney Gymnasium.

His firm's designs alternated between revivals of Gothic, Georgian, eighteenth-century French, and classical styles. Pope designed the Henry E. Huntington mausoleum on the grounds of The Huntington Library in southern California. He later used the design as a prototype for the Jefferson Memorial in Washington, D.C. The Jefferson Memorial and the National Gallery of Art were both neoclassical, modeled by Pope on the Roman Pantheon.

Lesser known projects by Pope's firm include Union Station, Richmond, Virginia (1917), with a central rotunda capped with a low saucer dome; it now houses the Science Museum of Virginia; Branch House (1917–1919), a Tudor-style mansion in Richmond, now housing the Virginia Center for Architecture; the Baltimore Museum of Art; and in Washington, D.C., the National City Christian Church, DAR Constitution Hall, American Pharmacists Association Building, Ward Homestead, and the National Archives Building (illustration, left). In Milwaukee, Wisconsin, he designed a severe neo-Georgian clubhouse for the University Club (1926). In Oneonta, New York, he designed the first building for Hartwick College: Bresee Hall was constructed in 1928. In 1932, he constructed the chapter house for Alpha Delta Phi at Cornell University in Ithaca, New York.  Earlier, he designed the City Hall in Plattsburgh, New York, which was completed in 1917, and the city's Macdonough Monument, erected in 1926 to commemorate the naval victory of Commodore Macdonough in the Battle of Plattsburgh on September 11, 1814.

Pope designed additions to the Tate Gallery and British Museum in London, an unusual honor for an American architect, and the War Memorial at Montfaucon-d'Argonne, France. Pope also designed extensive alterations to Belcourt, the Newport residence of Oliver and Alva Belmont. The Georgian Revival residence he built in 1919 for Thomas H. Frothingham in Far Hills, New Jersey has been adapted as the United States Golf Association Museum.

Pope was a member of the U.S. Commission of Fine Arts in Washington, DC from 1912 to 1922, serving as vice chairman from 1921 to 1922.  He also served on the Board of Architectural Consultants for the Federal Triangle complex in Washington, D.C.

Legacy
A 1991 exhibition at the National Gallery of Art, John Russell Pope and the Building of the National Gallery of Art, spurred reappraisal of his work. For some time, it had been scorned and derided as overly historicist by many critics influenced by International Modernism.

Pope also served as an early mentor and employer of American modernist Lester C. Tichy.

Pope was the maternal grandfather of the actress Andra Akers.

Gallery

Selected works
 1910: William B. Leeds Mausoleum, Woodlawn Cemetery, The Bronx, New York
 1926: University Club, Milwaukee, Wisconsin
 1927: Huntington Mausoleum, San Marino, California
 1927: "The Waves" (Pope's Newport residence), 61 Ledge Road, Newport, Rhode Island
 1931: First Congregational Church, Columbus, Ohio
 1933–1935: National Archives Building, Washington, D.C.
 1936: Dixie Plantation House, Greenville, Florida
 1938–1941: National Gallery of Art, Washington, D.C.
 1939–1942: Jefferson Memorial, Washington, D.C.

See also
 :Category:John Russell Pope buildings
 Eggers & Higgins

References

Bibliography
 Bedford, Steven McLeod. John Russell Pope: Architect of Empire, New York: 1998.
 Garrison, James B. Mastering Tradition: The Residential Architecture of John Russell Pope. New York: Acanthus Press, 2004.

External links

 University Club, Milwaukee
 
 
 John Russell Pope's Master Plan for Dartmouth, 1919
 Pictures and Info on John Russell Pope's Historic Long Island Commissions
 "Blanchard Randall Papers,1914–1969" Baltimore Museum Of Art <https://artbma.org/documents/findingAids/BMA_Board-of-Trustees-Records.pdf>
 "Architect John Russell Pope's Baltimore" March 31 – August 1, 2004. The Baltimore Museum of Art.
 Smith, H. D. "Recent Domestic Architecture from the Designs of John Russell Pope."  The Brickbuilder, Vol. XXV, No. 8, August 1916. pp. 189-204 and following plates.

1874 births
1937 deaths
Architects from New York City
Columbia Graduate School of Architecture, Planning and Preservation alumni
American alumni of the École des Beaux-Arts
Olympic silver medalists in art competitions
Medalists at the 1932 Summer Olympics
Olympic competitors in art competitions
Fellows of the American Institute of Architects